Zachary Ernest Segovia (born April 11, 1983) is an American former professional baseball pitcher. He has played in Major League Baseball (MLB) for the Philadelphia Phillies and Washington Nationals.

Career

Philadelphia Phillies
Segovia was drafted by the Philadelphia Phillies in the second round of the 2002 MLB draft. He made his professional debut that season playing for the Rookie League GCL Phillies. He played for the GCL Phillies and the Class A Lakewood BlueClaws in 2003.

In 2004, Segovia missed the entire season while recovering from Tommy John surgery on his right elbow performed in October 2003. He returned to play with the Class A-Advanced Clearwater Phillies in 2005. In 2006, Segovia played with Clearwater Threshers and the Double-A Reading Phillies.

Segovia, who made the Phillies 2007 Opening Day roster, made his MLB debut on April 8, 2007, against the Florida Marlins. He pitched five innings in his first start, giving up eight hits, five runs, and striking out two, while walking just one batter. He also pitched for Reading and the Triple-A Ottawa Lynx that season. He began the 2009 season playing for Clearwater and Reading.

Washington Nationals
He was released by the Phillies on June 12 and was signed as a free agent by the Washington Nationals on June 18. He played eight games for MLB. The rest of the season was spent in their minor league system with the Rookie GCL Nationals, Class A Hagerstown Suns, Class A-Advanced Potomac Nationals, and Double-A Harrisburg Senators. Segovia was released from the Nationals organization on December 10, 2009.

New York Yankees
On January 5, 2010, he signed a minor league contract with the New York Yankees with an invitation to spring training. He was assigned to Triple-A Scranton/Wilkes-Barre, where he pitched for the entire 2010 season.

Milwaukee Brewers
Segovia signed a minor league contract with an invitation to spring training with the Milwaukee Brewers for the 2011 season.

Colorado Rockies
The Colorado Rockies signed him to a minor league contract on February 15, 2012.

Detroit Tigers
He pitched for the Double A Erie SeaWolves of Detroit Tigers Organization in 2012.

Texas Rangers
He signed a minor league deal with the Texas Rangers on August 25, 2014.

San Diego Padres
He signed a minor league contract with the San Diego Padres in February 2015. He was released on June 21, 2015.

Acereros de Monclova
On March 28, 2016, Segovia signed with the Acereros de Monclova of the Mexican Baseball League. He was released on June 28, 2016.

Lamigo Monkeys
On July 4, 2016, he signed for Lamigo Monkeys of the Chinese Professional Baseball League.

Chinatrust Brothers
On February 8, 2018, Segovia signed with the Chinatrust Brothers of the Chinese Professional Baseball League. He was released on July 21, 2018, and finished his campaign with a 7.13 ERA and 1.69 WHIP over 77 innings pitched.

Second stint with Monclova
On August 1, 2018, Segovia signed back with the Acereros de Monclova of the Mexican League.

Pericos de Puebla
On April 6, 2019, Segovia signed with the Pericos de Puebla of the Mexican League.

Third stint with Monclova
On June 7, 2019, Segovia was traded back to the Acereros de Monclova of the Mexican League. He was released on June 30, 2019.

Bravos de León
On July 2, 2019, Segovia signed with the Bravos de León of the Mexican League. He became a free agent following the season. Segovia announced his retirement from professional baseball on March 11, 2020.

References

External links
, or CPBL

1983 births
Living people
Acereros de Monclova players
American expatriate baseball players in Canada
American expatriate baseball players in Mexico
American expatriate baseball players in Taiwan
Baseball players from Dallas
Bravos de León players
CTBC Brothers players
Clearwater Threshers players
Erie SeaWolves players
Gulf Coast Nationals players
Florida Complex League Phillies players
Hagerstown Suns players
Harrisburg Senators players
Lakewood BlueClaws players
Lamigo Monkeys players
Major League Baseball pitchers
Mexican League baseball pitchers
Nashville Sounds players
Ottawa Lynx players
Pericos de Puebla players
Philadelphia Phillies players
Potomac Nationals players
Reading Phillies players
Round Rock Express players
Scranton/Wilkes-Barre Yankees players
Syracuse Chiefs players
Uni-President 7-Eleven Lions players
United States national baseball team players
Washington Nationals players
York Revolution players
American expatriate baseball players in the Dominican Republic
Diablos Rojos del México players
El Paso Chihuahuas players
Estrellas Orientales players
Indios de Mayagüez players
Leones de Ponce players
Leones del Escogido players
American expatriate baseball players in Venezuela
Navegantes del Magallanes players
Peoria Saguaros players
Tigres de Aragua players
Toros del Este players